Euchaetis is a genus of moths of the family Oecophoridae.

Species
Euchaetis coccoscela  (Turner, 1946)
Euchaetis crypsichroa  Lower, 1893
Euchaetis cryptorrhoda  (Turner, 1946)
Euchaetis endoleuca  Meyrick, 1888
Euchaetis euspilomela  (Lower, 1893)
Euchaetis habrocosma  Meyrick, 1883
Euchaetis holoclera  Meyrick, 1888
Euchaetis incarnatella  (Walker, 1864)
Euchaetis inceptella  (Walker, 1864)
Euchaetis inclusella  (Walker, 1864)
Euchaetis insana  (Meyrick, 1921)
Euchaetis iospila  Meyrick, 1888
Euchaetis iozona  (Lower, 1893)
Euchaetis metallota  Meyrick, 1883
Euchaetis parthenopa  (Meyrick, 1883)
Euchaetis poliarcha  Meyrick, 1888
Euchaetis rhizobola  Meyrick, 1888
Euchaetis rhodochila  (Turner, 1946)
Euchaetis rufogrisea  (Meyrick, 1883)

References

Markku Savela's ftp.funet.fi

 
Oecophorinae
Moth genera